Petrorhagia dubia is a species of flowering plant in the family Caryophyllaceae known by the common name hairy pink. It is native to southern Europe and the Mediterranean Basin, but it is known on other continents, including Australia and North and South America, as an introduced species and sometimes a weed. It is an annual herb growing 25 to 60 centimeters tall, but known to reach 90 centimeters in height. The leaves are up to 6 centimeters long, sheathing the stem at the bases. The inflorescence bears a head-like cluster of flowers, their bases enclosed in a large, expanded mass of wide, claw-tipped bracts. The flower corollas are each further encased in a tubular calyx of sepals. The petals are bright pink to magenta or lavender in color with darker veins. Each is heart-shaped or divided into two lobes at the tip. The fruit is a capsule containing many tiny seeds.

References

External links
Jepson Manual Treatment
USDA Plants Profile
Flora of North America
Photo gallery

Caryophyllaceae